is a Japanese actor. He won the award for best actor at the 8th Yokohama Film Festival for the 1986 film Minami e Hashire, Umi no Michi o. He was a Zainichi Korean until April 5, 2017, when he naturalized. Iwaki is also a racing car driver.

Filmography

Films
The Doberman Cop (1977)
Proof of the Man (1977) — Kori Kyohei
The Resurrection of the Golden Wolf (1979)
Minami e Hashire, Umi no Michi o! (1986) — Tomishima Ryo
Family (2001)
Family 2 (2001)
Kikoku (2003)
The Mole Song: Undercover Agent Reiji (2014)
The Mole Song: Hong Kong Capriccio (2016)
Back Street Girls: Gokudols (2019) — Inukinoni Manjiro
The Mole Song: Final (2021)

Television
Kita no Kuni kara (1981–2002, Fuji TV) - Sōta Kitamura
Asunaro Hakusho (1993, Fuji TV)
Good Luck!! (2003, TBS) — Mizushima Kousaku
My Boss My Hero (2006, NTV) — Minami Takayuki (Principal)
Miss Pilot (2013, Fuji TV) — Shinozaki Kazutoyo

References

External links

1951 births
Living people
Japanese male actors
Japanese male actors of Korean descent
People from Tokyo